Carl Johann Christian "Charles" Tisch was an American politician, member of the Wisconsin State Assembly, and historical person for whom Tisch Mills, Wisconsin was named.

Biography
Tisch was born on May 26, 1829 in Eutin, Germany. In 1851, he settled in what is now Mishicot (town), Wisconsin in Manitowoc County, Wisconsin. He would build a sawmill and gristmills in what would become Tisch Mills, Wisconsin, which was named after him. On January 10, 1895, Tisch died of blood poisoning in Wausau, Wisconsin.

Political career
Tisch was a member of the Assembly in 1877 and 1878. Other positions he held include County Judge of Kewaunee County, Wisconsin from 1870 to 1874. He was a Democrat.

References

External links

People from Eutin
People from Mishicot, Wisconsin
People from Kewaunee County, Wisconsin
Businesspeople from Wisconsin
Democratic Party members of the Wisconsin State Assembly
Wisconsin state court judges
County judges in the United States
Millers
1829 births
1895 deaths
Deaths from sepsis
Burials in Wisconsin
American city founders
German emigrants to the United States
19th-century American politicians
19th-century American businesspeople
19th-century American judges